Stephen W. Oliver is a United States Air Force major general who served as the assistant deputy under secretary for international affairs of the U.S. Air Force. Previously, he was the vice commander of the USAF Expeditionary Center.

References

External links

Year of birth missing (living people)
Living people
Place of birth missing (living people)
United States Air Force generals